Olivella bullula is a species of small sea snail, marine gastropod mollusk in the subfamily Olivellinae, in the family Olividae, the olives.  Species in the genus Olivella are commonly called dwarf olives.

Description
"Shell acuminately oblong, thin, rather inflated, spire much exserted, columella arched, rather callous at the base; transparent-white, with a narrow opake zone beneath the sutures.".

Distribution
West Indies, Caribbean basin.

References

bullula
Gastropods described in 1850